Thomas Jacob Sunkel (August 9, 1912 – April 6, 2002), was a professional baseball player who played pitcher in the Major Leagues from 1937 to 1944. He would play for the St. Louis Cardinals, New York Giants, and Brooklyn Dodgers.

Sunkel's left eye was damaged when he was a child which caused him to lose all sight in this eye in 1941. He pitched and batted with his head cocked to the side to compensate.

Sunkel was born and died in Paris, Illinois.

References

External links

1912 births
2002 deaths
Major League Baseball pitchers
Baseball players from Illinois
St. Louis Cardinals players
Brooklyn Dodgers players
New York Giants (NL) players
People from Paris, Illinois
Greensburg Trojans players
Minor league baseball managers
Asheville Tourists players
Huntington Red Birds players
Greenwood Chiefs players
Decatur Commodores players
Rochester Red Wings players
Atlanta Crackers players
Columbus Red Birds players
Syracuse Chiefs players
Jersey City Giants players
Montreal Royals players
St. Paul Saints (AA) players
New Orleans Pelicans (baseball) players
Baseball players with disabilities
Paris Lakers players
Sportspeople with a vision impairment